Allerton Priory, Liverpool, England, is a Grade II* listed building designed by Alfred Waterhouse.

A house originally known as Allerton Lodge, but later Allerton Priory, was built on the property in the early 1800s for William Rutson, a Liverpool merchant. In 1866 John Grant Morris, a colliery owner, bought the estate and commissioned architect Alfred Waterhouse to rebuild the house.

In 1897 a Monsignor Nugent (1822-1905) founded a House of Providence (Magdalen Asylum), which was run by nuns as a refuge for unmarried Irish girls. In 1915, the Sisters established a (residential) School for Special Educational Needs (girls). It was temporary certified 18 May 1916 for 15 girls, then re-certified in 1917 as Allerton Priory Special Industrial School for mentally defective girls under 15. It ceased to be a Home Office school in 1933. The Nuns owned the property until 1986.

The property was then purchased by Danny Mullholland and converted to a Nursing Home. It was managed by a local family until 1994/95, but has since been converted into luxury apartments. Around 2010 it was also a film location as "Anubis House" for the hit TV Series "House of Anubis" by Nickelodeon.

References

Grade II* listed buildings in Liverpool
Houses in Merseyside